Maximiliano Fernando Oliva (born 16 March 1990 in Gobernador Crespo, Santa Fe), is an Argentine footballer who plays as a left-back for Tristán Suárez.

Oliva made his debut for River Plate as a 17-year-old in a home loss to Colón on November 24, 2007. In 2008, he was part of River Plate's squad that won the Clausura tournament, but he did not feature in any of the games.

In January 2009 Oliva was selected to join the Argentina under-20 squad for the 2009 South American Youth Championship in Venezuela.

Honours

Club
Dinamo București
Cupa Ligii: 2016–17

References

External links 
 

1990 births
Living people
Footballers from Santa Fe, Argentina
Argentine footballers
Argentine expatriate footballers
Argentina youth international footballers
Argentina under-20 international footballers
Association football defenders
Club Atlético River Plate footballers
Club Atlético Tigre footballers
Independiente Rivadavia footballers
San Martín de San Juan footballers
Estudiantes de La Plata footballers
Crucero del Norte footballers
Aris Limassol FC players
FC Dinamo București players
ACS Poli Timișoara players
Enosis Neon Paralimni FC players
Club Atlético Alvarado players
Boca Unidos footballers
CSyD Tristán Suárez footballers
Cypriot First Division players
Liga I players
Argentine Primera División players
Primera Nacional players
Argentine expatriate sportspeople in Cyprus
Argentine expatriate sportspeople in Romania
Expatriate footballers in Cyprus
Expatriate footballers in Romania